"Annie, Let's Not Wait" is a song by Guillemots, which appears on the band's debut album, Through the Windowpane. A re-recording was released as a single on 15 January 2007, featuring the Guillemettes, a trio of female vocalists who first appeared with the band in their appearance on Top of the Pops in June 2006, performing "Made-Up Love Song #43". Promotion for the single included an appearance by the band on Friday Night with Jonathan Ross in December 2006.

Track listings

CD 1
"Annie, Let's Not Wait" (full-length single version)
"Photograph" (demo)
"Take Me Out" (BBC Radio 1 Live Lounge version of the Franz Ferdinand song, recorded 5 September 2006)
"Annie, Let's Not Wait" (video)

CD 2
"Annie, Let's Not Wait" (radio edit)
"We're Here" (string version)

7-inch Picture Disc
A-side: "Annie Let's Not Wait" (full-length single version)
B-side: "In Your Arms"

Digital Download
"Annie, Let's Not Wait" (single version) - 4:31
"Photograph" (Demo) - 5:04
"Annie, Let's Not Wait" - 5:04
"Annie, Let's Not Wait" (Acoustic Gideon Coe Hub Session) - 4:38

Notes

2007 singles
Guillemots (band) songs
2006 songs
Polydor Records singles